David Dobrik (
Dávid Julián Dobrík (born July 23, 1996)) is an Internet personality. He found early success on the video-sharing platform Vine, before starting his vlog on YouTube in 2015. In 2019, he co-founded the photography app Dispo.

Dobrik is known for being the leader of the popular YouTube ensemble The Vlog Squad, which features prominently in his vlogs and comprises rotating selections of his friend group. As of July 6, 2022, Dobrik's vlog channel had 19 million subscribers and 7.1 billion views. The channel was the fifth-most viewed creator channel on YouTube in 2019, with 2.4 billion views that year. Controversies have arisen around Dobrik's involvement with the Vlog Squad, including allegations of sexual assault, bullying, and injuring former member Jeff Wittek.

Beyond internet entertainment, Dobrik voice-acted in The Angry Birds Movie 2, was one of the judges on the Nickelodeon TV show America's Most Musical Family, and hosted a SpongeBob SquarePants special, as well as the first season of Discovery Channel's reality competition TV show Dodgeball Thunderdome.

Early life
Dobrik was born on July 23, 1996, in Košice, Slovakia. His family moved to Vernon Hills, Illinois, when he was six years old. He attended Vernon Hills High School, where he played tennis. He qualified for the 2014 Boys Tennis State Tournament, where he won third place in the doubles tournaments. After graduating high school, he moved to Los Angeles to pursue his Vine career.

Career

2013–2016: Vine and YouTube beginnings
In 2013, Dobrik uploaded his first video onto Vine. He collaborated on Vines with other popular Viners such as Liza Koshy, Gabbie Hanna, Jason Nash, and Zane & Heath. Before starting his own YouTube channel, Dobrik was part of the YouTube group, Second Class. Dobrik launched his self-titled YouTube channel in 2015. 

In August 2016, Dobrik created his second channel, David Dobrik Too, where he posts blooper reels, challenge videos, and his more direct sponsorship deals.

2017–present: YouTube career

Dobrik gained fans in recent years due to his high-energy videos which consists of pranks, inside jokes, cute animals, Vine and YouTube stars, real celebrities and various comedy bit characters, which he previously posted three days a week and are currently posted two days a week.
In December 2018, Dobrik was given a Diamond Play Button by YouTube in recognition of his YouTube channel surpassing 10 million subscribers. Dobrik was also named one of the "10 Social Media Personalities Making the Most Noise" for 2018 by Paper magazine.

In July 2019, Dobrik was featured by W magazine among others for being part of a trend of creating a separate Instagram account dedicated to their photos taken with the use of films or disposable cameras.

In August 2019, Dobrik was featured by Variety magazine in their annual "Power of Young Hollywood" list. In the same month, Dobrik co-hosted the 2019 Teen Choice Awards with Lucy Hale, himself receiving the award for Choice Male Web Star. Dobrik also competed in the first-ever Kids' Choice Sports Championship.

In October 2019, Dobrik was ranked the most popular media personality among teenagers based on a survey by the Piper Jaffray & Co.

In November 2019, People magazine named Dobrik Sexiest Heartthrob of 2019, over runner-ups including Harry Styles and Shawn Mendes. That same month, Dobrik was one of the presenters at the American Music Awards of 2019, and was also a guest judge in the first episode of the ninth season of Chopped Junior.

In December 2019, Dobrik was named in YouTube Rewind 2019 as the fifth-most-viewed creator that year on the platform, with 2.4 billion views. Also that month, a video of Dobrik's on TikTok featuring a large-scale elephant's toothpaste experiment was named the Number 1 Top Viral Video on the platform in 2019, with 17.5 million likes and 180 million views.

Dobrik also appeared on The Tonight Show with Jimmy Fallon as his late-night television debut, discussing about his inspiration for his viral videos and successful YouTube channel as well as his first interaction with Justin Bieber. Dobrik's appearance on the show alongside Martin Short and Yola was credited for the show being ranked as the #1 most-social late-night series of the week, amassing 2.2 million Interactions across Facebook, Instagram, and Twitter, up +582% according to Nielsen Social Content Ratings. The show was tied for first place for the late-night ratings week of 20 January through 24 in the key demographic of adults aged 18 to 49, as well as adults aged 18 to 34, and won the week outright versus its competition in all key adult-female demographics according to Nielsen Media Research. The show also ranked first across all entertainment brands in total and new views for the week with five videos featuring Dobrik totaling more than 15 million views.

In April 2020, Dobrik was ranked, for the second time in a row, the most popular media personality among teenagers based on a survey by the Piper Jaffray & Co.

In August 2020, Dobrik became one of the first 19 recipients of TikTok's $1 billion Creator Fund due to "his ability to show what it means to be your authentic self, bring joy and inspiration to people and creatively connect with an audience," according to Vanessa Pappas, general manager of TikTok US. Dobrik became the host of a reality competition television show on the Discovery Channel called Dodgeball Thunderdome with Erin Lim and Andrew Hawkins as his co-hosts. Dobrik also plans to evolve his David's Disposable App into a full-fledged social media network which aims to conceive the next great social media network built on authenticity. Dobrik officially joined Twitch to launch his own streaming channel. His initial live stream peaked at 47,233 concurrent viewers according to the analytics tool SullyGnome, and his channel gained 201 thousand followers total.

In September 2021, Dobrik signed with streaming platform Discovery+ for a travel series called Discovering David Dobrik which began streaming in November 2021.

Vlogging career
In a July 2019 profile, The Verge wrote of Dobrik's vlog: "Think of it like Friends, but for vloggers. Essentially, Dobrik created the first sitcom-vlog. There are musical transitions, a returning cast of characters that drive the story forward, and Dobrik's laughter acts as a laugh track for viewers. We know when to laugh because Dobrik does, and it all has to do with his friends' antics." In that same profile, writer Julia Alexander noted Dobrik's editing style for bringing Vine's quick-cut style format to YouTube. "It led to a wave of creators who copied him," she wrote, "many of whom continue to shape the site's content today."

Cast ("The Vlog Squad")
Dobrik's vlogs feature a recurring group of friends who collectively comprise "The Vlog Squad". Because the cast is, at its core, a friend group, membership in the cast of the vlogs is amorphous. Generally, people considered part of the Vlog Squad include Jason Nash, Natalie Mariduena, Josh Peck, Zane Hijazi, Heath Hussar, Mariah Amato, Scotty Sire, Ilya Fedorovich, Nick Antonyan and his siblings Vardan and Suzy, Matt King, Toddy Smith, Corinna Kopf, Jeff Wittek, Joe Vulpis, Carly Incontro and Erin Gilfoy.

Because the cast of the vlogs samples Dobrik's larger friend group, membership rotates on an ongoing basis. Former or infrequently-featured members include Gabbie Hanna, Liza Koshy, Trisha Paytas, Nik Keswani (known as BigNik), Dom Zeglaitis, Seth Francois, Brandon Calvillo, Elton Castee, Kristen McAtee and Alex Ernst.

Speaking at the 2019 Streamy Awards, Dobrik said of winning the Ensemble Cast prize with the Vlog Squad, "Ensemble is like, my favorite one to win... [The nominations are] insane, and I can't say this enough—it's all because of these guys," he added. "I have a group of like, 15, 20, 30 friends, and they help me day in and day out with all the videos."

Other ventures 
In 2019, Dobrik became a judge in a musical competition on Nickelodeon titled America's Most Musical Family, alongside Ciara and Debbie Gibson.

In January 2020, Dobrik launched the mobile camera app Dispo. As of January 2020, the app had surpassed a million downloads and had landed briefly at the top of the list for most popular free apps on Apple's App Store, sitting ahead of Disney+ and Instagram as well as winning a spot on Apple's curated "Apps We Love Right Now" list.

In October 2020, Dobrik launched his fragrance brand David's Perfume with Flower Shop Perfumes Co. He partnered with HeadCount to give five fans a chance to win one of five Tesla 3 models to encourage voter registration via the nonprofit HeadCount's website. This partnership has surpassed their goal of 200,000 voters registered for the 2020 election, hitting a grand total of 300,000 and counting. Later on, the New York-based organization was able to count nearly 120,000 people registered leading for it to be the single largest voting drive in the 16-year history of HeadCount, which has worked with many celebrities, mostly musicians such as Billie Eilish and Ariana Grande.

In November 2020, People magazine named Dobrik Sexiest YouTube Star of 2020 over runner-ups including Donal Skehan and Korean Englishman's Josh Carrott and Ollie Kendal. That same month, Dobrik was one of the presenters at the American Music Awards of 2020.

In December 2020, Dobrik was featured as honoree in the Forbes 30 Under 30 list for the year 2021 under the social media category. Dobrik was also named by Forbes as one of the highest-paid YouTube stars of 2020. That same month, Dobrik, alongside Keke Palmer, hosted a year-end special called "Peace Out 2020" on Facebook Watch which highlights memorable moments and memes from the year 2020.

In January 2021, Spotify tapped Dobrik to narrate Mary Shelley's Frankenstein, one of a dozen such celebrity partnerships to bolster their audiobook programming.

In November 2022, Dobrik opened a pizza restaurant, Doughbrik's Pizza, in Los Angeles.

Podcast
Views with David Dobrik & Jason Nash is hosted by Dobrik and Jason Nash. Its first episode was released on May 15, 2017, and it debuted 2nd on iTunes chart in podcast section. As of June 2021, there have been 199 episodes. It is published by Cadence13. 

In September 2018, Dobrik created his third YouTube channel, Views Podcast, where he posts the video version of his podcast. Dobrik was credited by The Verge for successfully integrating the podcast genre onto YouTube, which is an otherwise video-focused platform.

Controversies

Vlog Squad sexual assault allegations
In February 2021, Seth Francois, a former Vlog Squad member, accused Dobrik of sexual assault after being deceived into kissing Jason Nash while blindfolded. Being the only black member of the Vlog Squad, Francois stated he also felt "pressured to participate in bits that [came] off culturally insensitive." Former Vlog Squad member Nik Keswani accused Dobrik of bullying, stating it was the reason he left the group in 2018.

On March 16, 2021, Kat Tenbarge at Business Insider reported that during the filming of a 2018 vlog about group sex, a woman was allegedly raped during filming by then-Vlog Squad member Dom Zeglaitis while drunk and unable to consent. On the same day, Dobrik released a short video titled "Let's talk", in which he addressed some of the recent controversies related to him, specifically in regards to former members of the Vlog Squad. He did not specifically address the allegations against Zeglaitis from earlier that day. After the allegations, Dobrik lost numerous sponsors and fans, and also stepped down from his position at Dispo. 

On March 26, 2021, it was reported that YouTube had temporarily demonetized Dobrik's and Zeglaitis's channels over the incident, citing violations of its creator responsibility policy. After a three-month hiatus, Dobrik began posting again to his YouTube channel in July 2021, and by December 2021 his channel had rebounded to 20th largest channel in the world as measured by views per episode.

Dobrik injuring Jeff Wittek lawsuit 
In April 2021, Vlog Squad member Jeff Wittek released a documentary on his YouTube channel titled Don't Try This at Home, which explained the circumstances of an accident that happened in June 2020, when Wittek broke his skull and face, requiring major surgery. The incident occurred during a video shoot for Dobrik's comeback vlog when the Vlog Squad went wakeboarding in a shallow lake while being pulled by Dobrik using an excavator. Wittek's documentary included video showing fellow Vlog Squad member Corinna Kopf swinging from the line but starting to lose balance and nearly falling, prompting her to ask to be released, which Dobrik did not immediately do and causing her to accuse him of "taking things too far". When it was Wittek's turn, Dobrik swung him higher than anyone before him and then suddenly stopped. The momentum of Wittek continuing to swing around caused him to crash into the excavator and fall into the shallow lake while still attached to the line.

Wittek has since filed a lawsuit in $10 million worth of damages to Dobrik, regarding "general negligence and intentional tort".

Personal life
Dobrik has three younger siblings. As a Slovak citizen who arrived in the United States as a child and remained illegally, Dobrik is protected from deportation under DACA. He stated in a December 2018 interview that he speaks Slovak. He understands Hungarian, as his mother is Hungarian.  

In September 2021, Dobrik revealed in a vlog that he had obtained his green card  and could now travel outside the United States.

Dobrik dated fellow YouTube personality Liza Koshy from late 2015 to early 2018. They revealed their break-up in June 2018. On May 15, 2019, Dobrik legally married Lorraine Nash, Jason Nash's mother, as a comedic bit for one of his vlogs. On June 12, 2019, Dobrik announced that he and Nash had decided to end their marriage after one month. On November 22, 2019, Dobrik stated via Instagram that he had officially signed divorce papers and divorced Nash.

Filmography

Film

Short film

Television

Podcast

Music videos

Awards and nominations

|-
| 2017
| Shorty Awards
| Vlogger of the Year
| rowspan="3" | Himself
| 
|
|-
| rowspan="2" | 2017
| rowspan="2" | Streamy Awards
| Breakout Creator
| 
| rowspan="2" |
|-
| Creator of the Year
| 
|-
| rowspan="3" |2018
| rowspan="3" |Shorty Awards
| YouTuber of the Year
| Himself
| 
|
|-
| YouTube Ensemble
| Vlog Squad
| 
|
|-
| Best Podcast
| VIEWS with David Dobrik and Jason Nash
| 
|
|-
| rowspan="6" | 2018
| rowspan="6" |Streamy Awards
| Creator of the Year
| rowspan="2" | Himself
| 
| rowspan="6" |
|-
| First Person
| 
|-
| Best Podcast
| VIEWS with David Dobrik and Jason Nash
| 
|-
| Collaboration
| "FEARBOX Challenge" (with Jennifer Lopez)
| 
|-
| Ensemble Cast
| David's Vlog 
| 
|-
| Directing
| Himself
| 
|-
| 2019
| rowspan="1" |Kids' Choice Awards
| Favourite Social Star
| rowspan="4" | Himself
| 
|
|-
| 2019
| rowspan="1" | Shorty Awards
| YouTuber of the Year
| 
|
|-
| rowspan="2" | 2019
| rowspan="2" |Teen Choice Awards
| style="white-space: nowrap;" | Choice Male Web Star
| 
| rowspan="2" |
|-
| Choice YouTuber
| 
|-
| rowspan="4" | 2019
| rowspan="4" | Streamy Brand Awards
| rowspan="2" | Brand Engagement
| Chipotle + David Dobrik
| 
| rowspan="4" |
|-
| David Dobrik x SeatGeek: Becoming a Member of the VlogSquad
| 
|-
| rowspan="2" | Influencer Campaign
| Chipotle + David Dobrik
| 
|-
| David Dobrik x SeatGeek: Becoming a Member of the VlogSquad
| 
|-
| 2019
| style="white-space: nowrap;" | People's Choice Awards
| Social Star
| Himself
| 
|
|-
| rowspan="7" |2019
| rowspan="7" |Streamy Awards
| Creator of the Year
| rowspan="2" | Himself
| 
| rowspan="7" |
|-
| First Person
| 
|-
| Best Podcast
| VIEWS with David Dobrik and Jason Nash
| 
|-
| Collaboration
| "SURPRISING PEOPLE WITH KYLIE JENNER!!" (with Kylie Jenner)
| 
|-
| Ensemble Cast
| Vlog Squad
| 
|-
| Directing
| rowspan="2" | Himself
| 
|-
| Editing
| 
|-
| 2020
| Kids' Choice Awards
| Favorite Male Social Star
| Himself
| 
|
|-
|rowspan="5" |2020
|rowspan="5" |Streamy Awards
|Creator of the Year
|rowspan="2" |Himself
|
|rowspan="5" |
|-
|First Person
|
|-
|Collaboration
|SURPRISING PEOPLE WITH JUSTIN BIEBER!! (with Justin Bieber)
|
|-
|Podcast
|VIEWS with David Dobrik and Jason Nash
|
|-
|Brand Engagement
|Need for Speed Heat x David Dobrik – Electronic Arts
|
|-
|2021
|Kids' Choice Awards
|Favorite Male Social Star
|Himself
|
|
|}

References

External links

1996 births
21st-century Slovak male actors
Comedy YouTubers
Lifestyle YouTubers
Living people
People from Košice
People from Vernon Hills, Illinois
Prank YouTubers
Slovak emigrants to the United States
Slovak TikTokers
Slovak game show hosts
Streamy Award winners
Vine (service) celebrities
YouTube channels launched in 2015
YouTube podcasters
YouTube vloggers
Shorty Award winners
American game show hosts
Twitch (service) streamers
Undocumented immigrants to the United States
DACA recipients
YouTube controversies